is a Japanese term meaning , and the female equivalent to the male  in Japanese culture. The usage of the word  refers to either the leader of a girl gang or the entire gang itself, and is not used to refer to any one member of a girl gang.

The word  was originally used by delinquents, but has been used by the general population to describe the subculture since 1972.  were formed as a direct result of male gangs' refusal to accept female members, consequently the term has come to refer to the massive movement that brought feminism to public attention at a time when men of the ya‌ku‌za were thriving.

 reportedly first appeared in Japan during the 1960s, presenting themselves as the female equivalent to the  gangs, which were composed mostly of men. During the 1970s, as  gangs began to die out,  girl gangs began to rise in number. Gangs were initially small groups of girls sneaking cigarettes in school bathrooms, but eventually grew in numbers, as did their level of criminality. These gangs were commonly associated by violence and shop-lifting. Gangs ranged in size from Tokyo's United Shoplifters group, comprising roughly 80 members, to the Kanto Women Delinquent Alliance, rumored to have had around 20,000 members. Criminal activities and violence of the girl gangs in Japan reached such a high that sketches used to identify them in Japanese police pamphlets in the 1980s described aspects of their fashion as "omens of downfall".

Characteristics

Appearance and other signifiers
The common signifiers of  include brightly-dyed or permed hair, in colours of either blonde or light brown. Members of  also modify their school uniform by wearing coloured socks, rolling up their sleeves and lengthening their skirt, which are sometimes decorated with gang-affiliated symbols, kanji and/or slogans. The long skirts were a rejection of the popularity of the miniskirt, which had become popular in the 1960s during the sexual revolution. Though their skirts were long,  often cut their shirts to expose their midriffs. Converse sneakers were also another addition, and their clothes often had handmade modifications, including badges and buttons. They wore very little make-up and sported thin eyebrows. Adding to these features,  usually wore surgical masks, and often carried with them razor blades, bamboo swords and chains, which could be concealed under their skirts.

Codes of Conduct and similar attitudes 
 girls followed strict rules and codes of conduct within their gangs. Each gang possessed a hierarchy as well as their own means of punishment; cigarette burns were considered a minor punishment for stealing a boyfriend or disrespecting a senior member.  were reported to engage in activities such as stimulant use, shoplifting, theft, and violence, but if arrested, could be charged with the lesser offence of "pre-delinquency". Stimulants use often included sniffing paint thinner or glue.

Media and cultural influence 

In the 1970s and 1980s,  became popular characters in  manga.  characters could also be seen in  manga publications.

Pink film director Norifumi Suzuki made the first films in the seven-film Girl Boss series. He also started the four-film Terrifying Girls' High School series (1971–1972) featuring  characters. Both series featured prominent Pinky violent actresses Reiko Ike and Miki Sugimoto, as well as former beauty queen Reiko Oshida. On December 6, 2005, Panik House company released a four-disc region-1 DVD collection surveying  films entitled The Pinky Violence Collection. These films challenged traditional constructions of gender and female sexuality in postwar Japan.

Japanese crime writer Jake Adelstein said with regards to :

See also

References

Bibliography
 Weisser, Yuko Mihara. (2001). "Japanese Fighting Divas 101". Asian Cult Cinema #31, 2nd Quarter 2001.
 Ashcraft, Brian with Ueda Shoko. (2010). "Japanese Schoolgirl Confidential: How teenage girls made a nation cool". Kodansha. 

Female stock characters in anime and manga
Japanese words and phrases
Japanese subcultures
Slang terms for women
Juvenile delinquency in fiction
Women in Japan
Crime in Japan